Emil Shimoun Nona (born November 1, 1967) is the Archbishop of the Chaldean Catholic Diocese of Australia and New Zealand, prior to this he has been the Chaldean Catholic Archbishop of Mosul in the northern part of Iraq since the consent of Pope Benedict XVI to his election on 13 November 2009. He took over the archeparchy after the murder of Paulos Faraj Rahho in early 2008.

Early life
Nona, a Chaldo-Assyrian was born in Alqosh in 1967. After completing his secondary education in 1985, he entered the Chaldean Patriarchal Seminary and was ordained priest on 11 January 1991 in Baghdad. From 1993 to 1997 he was parochial vicar at Alqosh, then pastor until 2000. He then enrolled at the Pontifical Lateran University. In 2005 he obtained a doctorate in theology and returned home. From 2005 he served as a professor of anthropology at the Babel College. Later, he was named vicar general of the Chaldean Catholic eparchy (diocese) of Alqosh. He speaks Syriac, Arabic, Italian, and knows English.

Archbishop of Mosul
On May 5, 2009, the Synod of Bishops of the Chaldean Catholic Church elected Nona archeparch of Mosul of the Chaldeans. Pope Benedict XVI gave his consent to Nona's election on November 13, 2009. He was ordained a bishop on 8 January 2010, with Mar Emmanuel III Delly, patriarch of Babylon of the Chaldeans, as principal consecrator.  At the age of 42, he was the youngest Catholic archbishop in the world.

Speaking on the violence in Iraq in 2014 Nona said, all the Christians who were still living there have now fled. Nona, corroborated this while speaking with the worldwide Catholic relief service Aid to the Church in Need. “All the faithful have left the city. Who knows whether they will ever be able to return,” Abp. Nona said. “In 2003 there were still 35,000 faithful living in Mosul. Three thousand were still there in early 2014. Now probably not one is left here, and that is tragic,” the Archbishop declared. The city of Mosul, with a population of three million, was already mentioned in the Bible as Nineveh, and for thousands of years it has been a place of Christian civilisation. Archbishop Nona reported on the capture of Mosul: “We have never experienced anything like it before. A major city like Mosul has fallen victim to chaos.” The fighting, he said, began on Thursday, June 5; at first, however, it was limited to several districts in the western part of the city. “The army began to bombard the areas that were affected, but then the armed forces and the police suddenly left Mosul during the night between Monday and Tuesday, leaving the city at the mercy of the aggressors.” More than half of the inhabitants and the entire Christian community immediately fled to the nearby Nineveh Plain. “At around 5:00 on Tuesday morning we took in the families of refugees and tried to lodge them in schools, catechism classrooms and abandoned houses,” Nona reported.

Shortly after his exile began, Nona gave an interview in which he warned the West about the supposed dangers of accepting Muslims into their communities:

References

External links

Living people
1967 births
Iraqi Assyrian people
Chaldean archbishops
Iraqi archbishops
Iraqi Eastern Catholics
Chaldean Catholic Church
People from Alqosh
Christian critics of Islam
Pontifical Lateran University alumni
Iraqi bishops
21st-century Eastern Catholic archbishops
20th-century Eastern Catholic clergy